1995 Nagoya Grampus Eight season

Review and events

League results summary

League results by round

Competitions

Domestic results

J.League

Emperor's Cup

Player statistics

 † player(s) joined the team after the opening of this season.

Transfers

In:

Out:

Transfers during the season

In
 Seiji Honda (from Chukyo University)
伊藤 亘 (from Kokushikan University)
 Tomoya Yamagami (from Chukyo High School)

Out
 Tarō Gotō (to JEF United Ichihara)
 Takaki Kanda (retired)

Awards
J.League Most Valuable Player:  Stojković
J.League Best XI:  Stojković

References

Other pages
 J. League official site
 Nagoya Grampus official site

Nagoya Grampus Eight
Nagoya Grampus seasons